Brent J. St. Denis (born May 27, 1950) is a Canadian politician. He was a Liberal member of the House of Commons of Canada from 1993 to 2008, originally representing Algoma and later its successor ridings of Algoma—Manitoulin and Algoma—Manitoulin—Kapuskasing.

Born in Blind River, Ontario, St. Denis is a former executive assistant, industrial engineer, and teacher.

He is a former parliamentary secretary to the Minister of Natural Resources and the Minister of Transport, and also served as chair of the standing committee on industry, science, and technology, and the subcommittee on agenda and procedure of the standing committee on industry, science and technology.

St. Denis was defeated by Carol Hughes of the New Democratic Party in the 2008 federal election.

He is currently employed as clerk and treasurer for the township of Cockburn Island.

Electoral record

References

External links 
 Official website
 

1950 births
Living people
Members of the House of Commons of Canada from Ontario
Liberal Party of Canada MPs
Franco-Ontarian people
People from Algoma District
21st-century Canadian politicians